The Macau men's national under-18 basketball team is the national basketball team of Macau, governed by the Macau - China Basketball Association.

It represents the country in international under-18 (under age 18) basketball competitions.

See also
Macau men's national basketball team
Macau women's national under-18 basketball team

References

External links
 Archived records of Macau team participations

Basketball teams in Macau
Men's national under-18 basketball teams
Basketball